Santiago López (born 15 August 1997) is an Argentine professional footballer who plays as a centre-back.

Career
López's first-team promotion at San Lorenzo arrived in June 2017, with manager Diego Aguirre selecting him as a substitute for the club's final match of the 2016–17 Argentine Primera División season versus Talleres. He was subbed in on thirty-seven minutes for Marcos Angeleri, in a match which ended in a 1–1 draw. In August 2017, fellow Primera División team Patronato loaned López. He left ten months later following no appearances. On 11 July 2018, López joined Almagro of Primera B Nacional on loan. He left Almagro in June 2020, where his contract with San Lorenzo also expired.

In March 2021, Lopez signed with Torneo Argentino A club Boca Unidos. He left the club at the end of the year.

Career statistics
.

References

External links

1997 births
Living people
Sportspeople from Córdoba Province, Argentina
Argentine footballers
Association football defenders
Argentine Primera División players
Primera Nacional players
San Lorenzo de Almagro footballers
Club Atlético Patronato footballers
Club Almagro players
Boca Unidos footballers